Castelnuovo Belbo is a comune (municipality) in the Province of Asti in the Italian region Piedmont, located about  southeast of Turin and about  southeast of Asti.

Castelnuovo Belbo borders the following municipalities: Bergamasco, Bruno, Incisa Scapaccino, Mombaruzzo, and Nizza Monferrato.

Twin towns
 Diémoz, France

References

Cities and towns in Piedmont